Tapinoma litorale is a species of ant in the genus Tapinoma. Described by William Morton Wheeler in 1905, the species is endemic to various countries in North America.

References

Tapinoma
Hymenoptera of North America
Insects described in 1905